Seaweed oil, also called algae oil, is used for making food, with the purified product almost colorless and odorless. 

Seaweed oil is also used as a source of fatty acid dietary supplement, as it contains mono- and polyunsaturated fats, in particular EPA  and DHA, both of them Omega-3 fatty acids. The supplement's DHA content is roughly equivalent to that of salmon based fish oil supplement.

Seaweed oil is also used for biofuel, massage oil, soaps, and lotions.

See also
 List of omega-3 fatty acids
 Edible seaweed

References

Cooking oils
Dietary supplements